Eddy is a 2014 Italian film written, directed, and scored by Simone Borrelli, who also starred in the film.
The film is supported by the presidency of the Council of Ministers of the Italian Republic and had an exclusive world premiere in Strasbourg on 15 October 2014, where it received the accolade of being Official Human Rights Movie 2015 from the Council of Europe The film is about violence against children, volunteer doctors, and terrorist attacks in Syria.

Plot
Rodrigo is a young Italian surgeon who leaves Italy to volunteer at a field hospital in Syria, where there are a large number of innocent victims of violence of war as a result of the ongoing civil war.   
He was called to this location to help with as many of the resulting medical emergencies as possible. 
Just before leaving his home in Italy, his girlfriend Sofia tells him she is expecting a baby, hoping to convince him to stay. Finding himself at a very important moment in his life, in which he is becoming a father for the first time, Rodrigo's determination to carry on with his commitment as a doctor causes an argument with Sofia.  This argument results in Sofia unwillingly accepting Rodrigo's decision to leave.  Once Rodrigo arrives at the Syrian field hospital (located at the Syrian-Turkish border), he immediately becomes aware of the difficult place where he has ended up. 
He spends days witnessing the disturbing consequences of violence and finds himself saving primarily children, who continuously arrive at the hospital in critical condition. Here, Rodrigo learns about "the green parrots", little landmines disguised as parrot-shaped toys. These boobytraps are scattered all over the territory to attract unsuspecting victims who are mostly children.  One day, exhausted from having to watch the horror and violence as just a spectator and without intervening, Rodrigo loses his self-control and impulsively takes action in such a way that goes against the local code of ethics. After this forbidden action occurs, the equilibrium is destroyed, bringing all the characters to their inescapable destiny.

Accolades
This film had an exclusive premiere screening for the 47 heads of state and their delegations of the Member States at the Palace of Europe in Strasbourg on 15 October 2014, where it was acclaimed as "Official Human Rights Movie 2015" by the Council of Europe.
Furthermore, through an official public notice of the State Secretariat (UCE FF 887/2014), the Italian Prime Minister, Matteo Renzi and the Presidency of the council of Ministers of the Italian Republic decided to give Simone Borrelli and Eddy their official high patronage for the film's high social, cultural and artistic significance.
Thanks to the support of the Alma Mater Studiorum – University of Bologna, the most ancient university in Europe, the film has been translated and subtitled into over 10 languages.

Institutional partners 
Thanks to Eddys cultural and social significance, apart from being promoted by the Ministry of Education, Universities and Research, the film is also supported by prestigious International partners such as Unicef, and ONG such as Médecins Sans Frontières, International Red Cross and Red Crescent Movement and Amnesty International.

Distribution 
After being acclaimed as an "Official Human Rights Movie" at the exclusive premiere in Strasbourg, in 2015 Eddy will be distributed in all of the 47 European states within the Council of Europe's  network:  Albania, Andorra, Armenia, Austria, Azerbaijan, Belgium, Bosnia-Herzegovina, Bulgaria, Cyprus, Croatia, Denmark, Estonia, Ex-Republic of Jugoslavia, Macedonia, Finland, France, Georgia, Germany, Greece, Ireland, Iceland, Italy, Latvia, Liechtenstein, Lithuania, Luxembourg, Malta, Moldavia, Monaco, Montenegro, Norway, Netherlands, Poland, Portugal, England, Czech Republic, Romania, Russia, San Marino, Serbia, Slovenia, Spain, Switzerland, Ukraine and Hungary.

Curiosity
Though Eddy is set in the Euphrates' valley in Syria, the film was shot entirely within the Province of Reggio Calabria
Eddy is a rare film project in the history of cinema in that just one artist,  Simone Borrelli, created the film as the only scriptwriter, director and  lead actor, while also being the only composer, arranger, musician of the scores and singer in the film's original soundtrack.

References

External links
 

2014 films
Films set in Syria
Films shot in Italy
Films about human rights
Films about children
2010s Italian-language films
Italian war drama films
2014 war drama films
2014 drama films